Kim Young-Ran (also Kim Yeong-ran, ; born 5 March 1981 in Icheon, Gyeonggi) is a South Korean judoka, who played for the extra-lightweight category. She is a three-time medalist (gold, silver, and bronze) for the 48 kg class at the Asian Judo Championships. She also won two silver medals in the same division at the 2002 Asian Games in Busan, and at the 2006 Asian Games in Doha, Qatar, losing out to Japan's Kayo Kitada, and China's Gao Feng, respectively.

Kim represented South Korea at the 2008 Summer Olympics in Beijing, where she competed for the women's extra-lightweight class (48 kg). She defeated Ukraine's Lyudmyla Lusnikova in the preliminary rounds, before losing out the quarterfinal match, by an ippon and an uchi mata gaeshi (inner thigh counter) to Romania's Alina Alexandra Dumitru. Because her opponent advanced further into the final match, Kim offered another shot for the bronze medal by entering the repechage rounds. Unfortunately, she finished only in ninth place, after losing out the second repechage bout to Hungary's Éva Csernoviczki, who successfully scored a koka, and a kouchi gari (small inner reap), at the end of the five-minute period.

References

External links
 
 
 

 NBC Olympics Profile

Living people
Olympic judoka of South Korea
Judoka at the 2008 Summer Olympics
Asian Games medalists in judo
Sportspeople from Gyeonggi Province
1981 births
Judoka at the 2002 Asian Games
Judoka at the 2006 Asian Games
South Korean female judoka
Asian Games silver medalists for South Korea
Medalists at the 2002 Asian Games
Medalists at the 2006 Asian Games
21st-century South Korean women